Achen is a surname. Notable people with the surname include:

Eggert Achen (1853–1913), Danish architect
Georg Achen (1860–1912), Danish painter, brother of Eggert
Sven Tito Achen (1922–1986), Argentine-Danish writer

See also
Hans von Aachen (1552–1615), German painter